T.N.A. Perumal or Thanjavur Nateshachary Ayyamperumal (15 November 1932 – 8 February 2017) was a wildlife photographer from Bangalore, Karnataka, India.

He started taking photographs of flora and fauna in 1960 and was awarded with several awards for his photography. He is a member of Mysore Photographic Society, Bangalore since 1961

Life and work

Perumal made black and white photographs during the 1960s and 1970s. He was a juror for several photographic contests. He has also given tips and guidance to youngsters who are interested in wildlife photography.

He settled in Bangalore and as of 2012, was working on a book, Reminiscences of a Wildlife Photographer.

Perumal died on February 8, 2017.

Awards and recognition

1963 & 1968 Awarded by the Fédération Internationale de l'Art Photographique
1975 : National Press Council Award for Industrial Photography
1977 : Associateship of the Royal Photographic Society, UK (ARPS)
1978 : Fellowship of Royal Photographic Society (FRPS), UK.
1983 : Master Photographer of French Federation de l Art Photographique in Nature photograph
1993 : Honorary Fellowship, India International Photographic Council, New Delhi
1995 : Karnataka Lalit Kala Academy award for Nature photography
2008 : Certificate of appreciation by Sanctuary Asia 
2012 : Lifetime Achievement award for wildlife photography, instituted by Government of India, Photo Division

Publications
 Encounters in the forest - co-edited with M. N. Jayakumar
 Photographing wildlife in India - field guide for photographers.
 Some South Indian butterflies - with K.Gunathilagaraj
 A Concise Field Guide to Indian Insects and Arachnids - with Meenakshi Venkataram
 Reminiscences of a Wildlife Photographer - Some of his best photographs and Autobiography
 Eye in the Jungle - Photographs and Writings - M. Krishnan compiled by Ashish and Shanti Chandola with T.N.A. Perumal.

References

External links 
 Second M. Krishnan Memorial Lecture, 2010

1932 births
2017 deaths
20th-century Indian photographers
Indian wildlife photographers
People from Bangalore Urban district
Artists from Bangalore
Photographers from Karnataka